"The Doctor" is a hit single released by The Doobie Brothers on their 1989 studio album, Cycles. The song, to date, is the last hit single that the band has released; it reached the number 1 spot on the Billboard mainstream rock chart and peaked at number 9 on the Billboard Hot 100.

The song was released with a music video that features the band playing to the tune with all of the members present. The video also got significant airplay on the music video channels throughout the US and helped propel the song into the spotlight. Guitarist and founding member Tom Johnston sang the lead vocal, after returning from years of being out of the band after Michael McDonald took over in the mid-1970s. Johnston told Songfacts that he wrote most of the song before the band re-formed when he was in a band called Border Patrol.

Charts

Year-end charts

References

1989 singles
The Doobie Brothers songs
Songs written by Charlie Midnight
Songs written by Tom Johnston (musician)
Songs written by Eddie Schwartz
Song recordings produced by Eddie Schwartz
1989 songs
Capitol Records singles
Song recordings produced by Rodney Mills